A peanut butter bun is a sweet bun found in Chinatown bakery shops. The bun has layers of peanut butter fillings, sometimes with light sprinkles of sugar mixed with the peanut butter for extra flavor. Unlike other similar buns, the shape varies, depending on the bakery.

The dough is made of flour, sugar, water, yeast, milk, and cream. Before putting it into the oven for baking, the bun is often brushed with sugar water in order to develop a nice glaze.

See also
 List of buns
 List of peanut dishes
 List of stuffed dishes

References

Sweet breads
Peanut butter confectionery
Buns
Stuffed dishes
Peanut dishes

zh:花生醬包